USS Indiana (SSN-789) is a nuclear powered United States Navy  attack submarine, named for the State of Indiana. Indiana was constructed by Huntington Ingalls Industries in partnership with the Electric Boat division of General Dynamics in Newport News, Virginia, with the initial contract awarded on 22 December 2008. Her keel was laid on 16 May 2015 and she was launched on 9 June 2017. The boat was christened on 29 April 2017 and sponsored by Diane Donald, wife of Admiral Kirkland H. Donald, USN (ret). She was commissioned on 29 September 2018 at Port Canaveral, Florida.

Crest
The gold torch and stars are symbols from the State Flag of Indiana. The torch represents liberty and enlightenment; the rays surrounding the torch represent their far-reaching influence. The stars in a circle surrounding the torch signify each state to join the Union before Indiana, which was the 19th state. Three gears and a head of wheat on either side of "SSN 789" represent the agriculture and industry native to the state of Indiana. The stylized "USS INDIANA" banner and the finish line racing flag pay tribute to the Indianapolis Motor Speedway and the Indy Car racing heritage of the State of Indiana. Silver and gold dolphins on either side of the head of wheat and gears represent the technical prowess of the enlisted and officer submarine community. The crest is encompassed by a gold outline of the state of Indiana.

References

Virginia-class submarines
Nuclear submarines of the United States Navy
Ships built in Groton, Connecticut
2017 ships